Richard William Spinrad is an American oceanographer and government official serving as the Administrator of the National Oceanic and Atmospheric Administration. He also concurrently serves as Under Secretary of Commerce for Oceans and Atmosphere.

Early life and education 
Raised in New York City, Spinrad earned a Bachelor of Arts degree in earth and planetary sciences in 1975 from Johns Hopkins University, and a Master of Science and a PhD in oceanography in 1978 and 1982, respectively, from Oregon State University at the Hatfield Marine Science Center.

Career 
Spinrad has held positions in the Office of Naval Research and Naval Meteorology and Oceanography Command; for this work, he was awarded the Navy Distinguished Civilian Service Award.

From 2003 to 2010, Spinrad was the head of the Office of Oceanic and Atmospheric Research within the NOAA, and also was the U.S. permanent representative of the Intergovernmental Oceanographic Commission from 2005 to 2009. He was the Vice President for Research at Oregon State University from 2010 to 2014.

Spinrad was chief scientist of the National Oceanic and Atmospheric Administration from 2014 to 2016, after which he was a professor of oceanography at Oregon State University.

On Earth Day 2021, Spinrad was nominated by President Joe Biden to serve as the Under Secretary of Commerce for Oceans and Atmosphere, which includes serving as the administrator of the National Oceanic and Atmospheric Administration (NOAA) in the Department of Commerce. On June 17, 2021, his nomination was confirmed by voice vote in the United States Senate. He was sworn in by Secretary of Commerce Gina Raimondo on June 22, 2021.

References 

Year of birth missing (living people)
Living people
Place of birth missing (living people)
People from New York City
Johns Hopkins University alumni
Oregon State University alumni
American oceanographers
Oregon State University faculty
Biden administration personnel
National Oceanic and Atmospheric Administration personnel
United States Under Secretaries of Commerce